Desiderius "Désiré" or "Dis" Victor Bourgeois  was a Belgian footballer born 13 December 1908 in Mechelen. His date of death remains unknown.

Biography 
Désiré Bourgeois played for KV Mechelen (RFC malinois) from 1926 to 1940. A midfielder, he was Belgian D2 Champion in 1928 and contributed to returning Royal FC malinois to the élite.

He played two matches for the Belgium team in 1934 and was selected in the same year for the Italian World Cup, but he did not play in this competition.

Honours
 Belgian international in 1934 (2 caps)
 Selected for the 1934 World Cup in Italy (did not play)
 Belgian D2 Champions in 1928 with FC malinois

References

External links
 

Belgian footballers
Belgium international footballers
1934 FIFA World Cup players
K.V. Mechelen players
1908 births
Year of death unknown
Belgian football managers
K.V. Mechelen managers
Sportspeople from Mechelen
Footballers from Antwerp Province
Association football midfielders